PBS Digital Studios is a non-profit organization through which PBS distributes original educational web video content. Based in Arlington, Virginia, it comprises both original series and partnerships with existing YouTube channels. Most of the series are about science, popular culture, art, food, news, and music.

History 
PBS Digital Studios was founded by Jason Seiken in June 2012. They had their first viral hit with a "remix" of autotuned vocals from Mr. Rogers' Neighborhood titled "Garden of Your Mind."

The PBS Digital Studios network has received more than 500 million views and has over 7 million subscribers. Popular series found on their channels include Crash Course, Blank on Blank, It’s Okay To Be Smart, and the multiple Webby Award–winning PBS Idea Channel. Each month, the shows average more than 5 million streams.

Its first scripted series, Frankenstein, MD, launched on August 19, 2014, and ran until October 31, 2014.

In 2015, PBS Digital Studios partnered with the Green brothers' series Crash Course, commissioning three courses in astronomy, U.S. government, and philosophy. Crash Course Astronomy launched January 15, 2015, Crash Course U.S. Government & Politics launched January 23, 2015, and Crash Course Philosophy launched February 8, 2016.

In addition to commissioning series, PBS Digital Studios have partnered with existing YouTube channels. They partnered with BrainCraft in June, 2014 and Physics Girl in August, 2015.

In 2017, the network cancelled a slew of its shows, including popular channels like PBS Game/Show & the PBS Idea Channel.

Current series 

 Above The Noise
 Be Smart
 CrashCourse
 Deep Look
 Far Out
 Fate & Fabled
 Hip-Hop and the Metaverse
 Indie Alaska
 Monstrum
 Only in El Paso
 Otherwords
 PBS Eons
 PBS Space Time
 PBS Terra
 PBS Vitals
 PBS Origins
 Reactions
 Ritual
 Serving Up Science
 Sound Field
 Subcultured
 Two Cents
 Weathered
 Why am I like this?

Past series 

As of December 2020, PBS Digital Studios lists the following as "past" series: 

 24 Frames
 After the Ice
 America From Scratch
 American Veteran: Keep It Close
 Animal IQ
 Antarctic Extremes
 A Moment of Science
 A People’s History of Asian America
 Are You MN Enough?
 The Art Assignment
 BBQwithFranklin
 Beat Making Lab
 Blank on Blank
 Bon Appétempt
 BrainCraft
 Central Standard
 Everything But the News
 First Person
 FullTimeKid
 Future of Work
 Good Gumbo
 The Good Stuff
 Gross Science
 Global Weirding with Katharine Hayhoe
 Historian's Take
 Hot Mess
 Human Elements
 I Contain Multitudes
 If Cities Could Dance
 The Intergalactic Nemesis
 Indie Lens Storycast
 InventorSeries
 It's Lit!
 Latinos Are Essential
 Makin' Friends with Ryan Miller
 Mike Likes Science
 Modern Comedian
 NOURISH
 opbmusicStagepass
 Origin Of Everything
 Out of Our Elements
 Overview
 Parentalogic
 PBS Diorama
 PBS Game/Show
 PBS Idea Channel
 PBS Infinite Series
 PBSoffbook
 PBS ReInventors
 PBS Short Docs
 Pancake Mountain
 Physics Girl
 Prideland
 Say It Loud
 Self-Evident
 Shanks FX
 STELLAR
 Tacos of Texas
 The ChatterBox
 Unusual Creatures
 You're Doing it Wrong

Reception 
Evan Desimone of NewMediaRockstars wrote, "Brilliant...takes you somewhere you didn’t expect." Sam Gutelle of Tubefilter called Idea Channel show, "Nothing short of superb."

References

External links 
 PBS Digital Studios: YouTube Channel—the location of their original web content
 Current PBS Digital Studios YouTube Shows
 National Public Media—information from the National Public Media website
 PBS—videos of PBS personalities whose words have been autotuned and remixed
 Forbes—Looking back on one year of PBS Digital Studios

YouTube channels launched in 2012
Education companies established in 2012
2012 establishments in the United States
American educational websites
Public Broadcasting Service